Orthetrum pruinosum, the crimson-tailed marsh hawk, is a species of dragonfly  in the family Libellulidae. It is a widespread species occurring from west India to Japan and south to Java and the Sunda Islands. A molecular phylogenetics study of Orthetrum dragonflies revealed that Orthetrum pruinosum is a cryptic species.

Subspecies
Three subspecies are recognized.
 O. p. neglectum  (mainland Asia)
 O. p. schneideri (Malay peninsula and Borneo)
 O. p. clelia (Philippines and Taiwan)

Description and habitat
It is a medium-sized dragonfly with dark thorax with slight purple pruinescence and purple colored abdomen. Young males have red abdomen as in Orthetrum chrysis. Females of both species look similar. It breeds in ponds, lakes and sluggish streams.

See also 
 List of odonates of Sri Lanka
 List of odonates of India
 List of odonata of Kerala

References

Libellulidae
Insects described in 1839